Rebeca Escribens is a Peruvian actress, TV Host., radio host and producer.

Filmography

Television 
María Rosa, búscame una esposa (2000) as Yolanda García
Latin Lover (2001) as Silvana
Luciana y Nicolás (2003) Host
¡Despierta América! (2004) Host
Gente Dmente (2004). Host
"Superestar Renovado" (2005) Host
Camino a la Fama (2005) Host
Bailando con las Estrellas (2005–2006) Host
Nunca te diré adiós (2005)
 Desde la butaca (2006)
Pobre millonaria (2007)
Los Barriga (2008) as Isabela Luján (villana) .
Que vivan las mujeres (2009) Host
El Gran Show: Season 2 - Heroine 7th Place
El Gran Show: Reyes del Show - Heroine

 Theater Evita (2005)

 Cinema Baño de Damas (2003)Talk Show (2006)La búsqueda del diente mágico'' (voz) (2009)

References

External links

20th-century Peruvian actresses
Living people
People from Lima
1977 births
Peruvian television presenters
21st-century Peruvian actresses
Peruvian film actresses
Peruvian musical theatre actresses
Actresses from Lima
Reality dancing competition contestants
Peruvian television actresses
Peruvian women television presenters